The Marbles may refer to:
The Marbles (duo), a British/Australian duo
The Marbles (quartet) (1965–1966), an American rock band from San Francisco